Marc Van Eeghem (14 September 1960 – 14 December 2017) was a Belgian actor. Born in Bruges, he had four siblings, including presenter Kurt Van Eeghem. He studied acting at the Studio Herman Teirlinck until 1983.

Van Eeghem died on 14 December 2017, aged 57, from prostate cancer, according to his brother, Kurt. He had been diagnosed seven years earlier and had stopped his chemotherapy in October.

Selected filmography
The van Paemel Family (1986)
Hector (1987)
Daens (1992)
Kulderzipken (1995)
Ons geluk (1995–1996)
Russian Dolls: Sex Trade (2005–2006)
Kiss Me Softly (Kus me zachtjes) (2012)

References

1960 births
2017 deaths
Flemish male stage actors
Flemish male television actors
Flemish male film actors
20th-century Flemish male actors
Entertainers from Bruges
Deaths from prostate cancer
Deaths from cancer in Belgium
21st-century Flemish male actors